The red-tailed laughingthrush (Trochalopteron milnei) is a species of bird in the family Leiothrichidae.

Subspecies
Subspecies include:
Trochalopteron milnei milnei David, 1874 (NW Fujian, in SE China)
Trochalopteron milnei sharpei Rippon, 1901 (N & E Myanmar, NW Thailand, N & C Laos, NW Vietnam, and S. China (W, S & SE Yunnan, W Guangxi).
Trochalopteron milnei sinianum Stresemann, 1930 (SE China (SE Sichuan, N Guizhou, C & NE Guangxi, S. Hunan, N. Guangdong).
Trochalopteron milnei vitryi (Delacour, 1932) (S. Laos, Vietnam)

Description
These medium-sized laughingthrushes are dull ochrous-grey, with a bright rufous-chestnut crown and a blackish face, with whitish ear-coverts. Wings and tail are crimson.

Distribution and habitat

This species can be found in China, Laos, Myanmar, Thailand, and Vietnam. These birds mainly inhabit the understorey of broadleaf evergreen forests,

Behaviour
This species mainly feeds on insects and small arthropods (beetles, centipedes, etc.), but also on berries and fruits (especially of Saurauja species). The breeding season lasts from April to June. The nest is made by both males and females and consists of a tidy cup mainly made of grasses and bamboo leaves. It is built at about 1 m above the ground level. Females lay 2-3 eggs, that are incubated for 17–18 days. The chicks are fed by both parents and leave the nest in 14–16 days.

References

External links
 Dollinger P. Zootier-Lexikon 
 iNaturalist

red-tailed laughingthrush
Birds of South China
Birds of Yunnan
Birds of Myanmar
Birds of Laos
Birds of Vietnam
red-tailed laughingthrush
Taxonomy articles created by Polbot
Articles containing video clips